This is a list of the Europarade number-one singles of 1961.

1961 record charts
Lists of number-one songs in Europe